Drescher is a surname. Notable people with the surname include:

Bill Drescher (1921–1968), American baseball player
Carl Wilhelm Drescher (1850–1925), Austrian violinist and composer
Dick Drescher (born 1946), American discus thrower
Fran Drescher (born 1957), American film and television actress and comedian
Gary Drescher, scientist in the field of artificial intelligence
Isabel Drescher (born 1994), German figure skater
Jack Drescher (born 1951), American psychiatrist and psychoanalyst
Ludvig Drescher (1881–1917), Danish amateur football player
Manuela Drescher, East German cross country skier
Otto Drescher (1895–1944), highly decorated Generalleutnant in the Wehrmacht during World War II
Seymour Drescher, American historian and a professor
Thomas Drescher (born 1978), German football player

See also 
 Dresher (surname)

German-language surnames
Occupational surnames